The Bellman Hangar was designed in the United Kingdom in 1936 by the Directorate of Works structural engineer, N. S. Bellman, as a temporary aircraft hangar capable of being erected or dismantled by unskilled labour with simple equipment and to be easily transportable. Commercial manufacturing rights were acquired by Head Wrightson & Co of Teesdale Iron Works, Thornaby-on-Tees. By November 1938, 10 had even been supplied to Russia.

Origins of transportable hangars

During World War I and for some time after, the only successful transportable hangar design was the Bessonneau hangar. This could be very quickly erected and secured to provide adequate shelter for a few small aeroplanes. But with post-war increases in the number and size of aeroplanes, the need for larger transportable accommodation soon became apparent. The Air Ministry therefore issued a specification in 1936 covering the dimensions and requirements for a light transportable shed for use in war. It had to be end-opening with doors at both ends, be capable of mass production and have interchangeable parts to permit rapid erection and dismantling with minimal permanent foundations. This specification was submitted to various designers and eventually two different designs were presented - the Bellman and the Callender Hangar.

An example of each was erected at two demonstration sites (airfields) in the north-east: at RAF Thornaby an Air Ministry design was built (later to be known as the Bellman hangar) and at RAF Usworth a Callender Cable & Construction design was built (later to be known as the Callender-Hamilton hangar). In 1938, the Bellman design was chosen as the standard Air Ministry wartime transportable shed, but Callender-Hamilton hangars were also purchased in small numbers for Royal Naval Air Stations until superseded by a new hangar type in 1943.

Construction

The Bellman hangar was designed in 1936 by N S Bellman (an Air Ministry Directorate of Works structural engineer) and its general dimensions were 175 ft long, 95 ft wide (87 ft 9in clear width) and 25 ft (clear height). It was constructed in 14 bays at 12 ft 6in centres based on a unit system of rolled steel sections; both walls and roof used the same standard units joined at the junction of wall and roof by a standard corner unit.

The time taken for 12 men to erect the hangar at Thornaby, including levelling the ground, laying door tracks, erecting the steelwork, and fitting oiled canvas doors, was 500 man-hours. Two light jib derricks using timber poles were required to erect the fabricated vertical and side members. The roof trusses were assembled on the ground before being lifted into position.

As a result of the bad winter of 1937 when a number of Bellman hangars at Thornaby were damaged after a heavy to severe fall of snow, production Bellmans were modified slightly to have steel-framed and steel-clad doors.

From 1938 to 1940 some 400 Bellman hangars were built in the UK, some 230 others were manufactured in Australia and probably more were produced under licence in other Commonwealth countries too. Pre-war examples are known to have been built at Brooklands (two for Hawker Aircraft Ltd were supplied by January 1939) and at Croydon Airport (one was provided there for Air Ministry use).

Bellmans proved to be invaluable in the early part of the war and met an increasing demand not only to supplement permanent hangars, but also to provide the total hangar requirements for many temporary Armament Training, Elementary Flying Training, and Air Navigation Schools.

Hangars were purchased in bulk and in 1938 a central parts storage depot was established at No. 3 MU at Milton, Oxfordshire. The parts for 40 Bellmans were stored in two specially built Bellman sheds for issue in the event of war. When all the hangars had been dispatched, these sheds were used for storing spare parts.

Surviving examples in the UK
Today, there are believed to be about 100 Bellman hangars still in RAF/MoD service in the UK - including Chivenor, Cosford, St Athan and RNAS Yeovilton airfields.

Two examples are preserved in UK aircraft museums - one at AeroVenture near Doncaster, South Yorkshire and another at Brooklands Museum in Surrey. The latter has a clear height of 25 ft (required for dispersed production of Vickers Wellington and Warwick aircraft in World War II), was one of ten erected at Brooklands between 1938 and 1944 and became a designated Grade II Listed building in 1999. Currently the UK's only Listed example, it was recently the subject of a major restoration project supported by a major Heritage Lottery Fund grant, was dismantled in late 2016 then restored off-site before being re-erected in 2017 adjacent to its original location on part of the former Brooklands Race Track's Finishing Straight. Officially reopened to visitors as the Brooklands Aircraft Factory on 13 November 2017, it now houses a comprehensive new exhibition about the aircraft industry at Brooklands and related locations.

Others survive at UK civil airports/airfields such as Blackpool Airport, Booker (4), Detling (1), Fairwood Common (Swansea Airport) (1), Halfpenny Green (3), Southend Airport (1),Stoke Orchard (1) and White Waltham (2). Further survivors can be found away from airfields in a variety of alternative uses.

Two Bellman hangars still stand at Daedalus Airfield, Lee-on-the-Solent. Both are in use; one storing gliders for Portsmouth Naval Gliding Club, while the other is used by Britten-Norman for client aircraft maintenance.

Four Bellman Hangars survive at Jurby Airfield, now disused, on the Isle of Man. One appropriately houses a Transport Museum.

There are nine Bellman hangars at No 101 Air Logistics Centre, Pakistan Air Force (PAF Base Faisal, Karachi in Pakistan). Before partition of the subcontinent, No 101 ALC, PAF, was No 1 MU India established in 1918 and later renamed N0 301 MU in 1942. Nine Bellman hangars were erected in 1945–46 and these are still in ALC use for storing aircraft stores.

Bellman hangars in Australia

Bellmans were also produced in Australia from c.1939 to 1945. They are often stated to have been made by Lysaght, but a history of Commonwealth Engineering reports that Waddington Engineering made over 200 Bellmans from a total of 283 ordered by the Air Ministry in Australia, but the steel within the structures is clearly marked as Lysaght suggesting the materials were sourced by Waddington from Lysaght, possibly explaining the conflicting stories. They were designed as easily transportable, temporary hangars which could be erected using unskilled labour and were used on war-time airfields constructed across Australia, particularly on training airfields.

Post war many were removed from temporary wartime airfields as they closed or downsized for civilian use and were relocated to expand or consolidate the permanent RAAF bases, or to establish new civilian airfields.

In Victoria the following Bellmans survive:
 Four imported UK manufactured examples on the Southern Tarmac at Point Cook (RAAF Williams) These are believed to be the only examples supplied from the UK surviving in Australia.
 A further ten Australian-built examples on the Northern Tarmac at Point Cook housing the RAAF Museum (RAAF Williams) (These Bellmans at Point Cook are therefore on the National Heritage List).
 Five at the RAAF Laverton base, these are listed on the Commonwealth Heritage List of that base (RAAF Williams)
 A further two adjacent to RAAF Laverton base on the road next to the railway, on land excised from the site.
 Thirteen at (Moorabbin Airport), having been moved from elsewhere when that civilian airfield was created post war.
 Twelve at (RAAF Base East Sale). Now the Central Flying School but was the former No.1 Operational Training Unit under EATS.
 Five at (Ballarat Airport), the former No. 1 Wireless Air Gunnery School under EATS. (These Bellmans are listed on the Victorian Heritage Register).
 Three were at Fishermen's Bend (Victoria) at the site of the Commonwealth Aircraft Corporation factory. (These have since been relocated to Tyabb Airport).
 Two at (Essendon Airport), possibly relating to either DAP aircraft manufacturing or the EFTS operating on the site during World War II.
 One at (Mildura Airport), the former No.2 Operational Training Unit.
 One at Benalla Airport, the former 11 Elementary Flying Training School under EATS (Empire Air Training Scheme).
 One at Nhill Airport, the former No.2 Air Navigator School under EATS.
 One at West Sale Airport.
 Four at Deniliquin Airport, New South Wales (built as part of the WWII No.7 Service Flying Training School)
 About six others were at Tottenham (former RAAF stores) but may have been removed by now.

In South Australia the following examples survive:
 Three at Parafield Airport, Adelaide, the former No. 1 Elementary Flying Training School 1940–1944. Two have been re-clad, but one which houses the Classic Jets Fighter Museum is in original condition
 One at Mount Gambier Airport, the former No. 2 Air Observers School 1941–1946. It has been re-clad
 One at Port Pirie Airport, the former No. 2 Bombing and Gunnery School 1941–1943. It is in original condition
 One at Waikerie Airport, used by the Waikerie Gliding Club.
Others existing in other parts of Australia include:
 One at Evans Head Memorial Aerodrome in Northern NSW, is the last remaining example from an original 17 at this historic heritage listed aerodrome and was recently restored as part of a NSW State Heritage endorsed restoration project. The Bellman is now home to the Evans Head Memorial Aerodrome Heritage Aviation Association (www.ehmahaa.org.au).  During World War II, this airfield was the largest air training facility in the Southern Hemisphere when home to the RAAF's No. 1 Bombing and Gunnery School and No. 1 Air Observers School (No. 1 BAGS and No. 1 AOS). 5,500 personnel trained on 109 separate RAAF Courses held there. 1,100 of these lost their lives mainly when serving in Britain with Bomber Command on operations over occupied Europe and Germany. This represented a 23% attrition rate compared to the Australian national average during the conflict of 7%. The aerodrome is listed on the New South Wales Heritage Register and this historic Hangar #156 was recently restored to house a former Royal Australian Air Force F-111 fighter jet (A8-147) in Australia's newest aviation museum which was officially opened on 25 August 2013.   
 Fourteen at RAAF Base Wagga (Forest Hill) central NSW; this is believed to be the largest number of Bellman hangars surviving at one location.
 One at Maryborough Airport, Queensland.
 Two at RAAF Base Townsville, Queensland, both re-clad.
 One at RAAF Base Fairbairn, Canberra Airport ACT.
 Three at Macrossan Stores Depot near Charters Towers, Queensland.
 One at Jezzine Barracks, Townsville, Queensland.
 Two in the General Aviation area at Cairns Airport, Queensland, one of which houses the North Queensland Aero Club and is in almost original condition; the other houses Skytrans and has been altered.
 Four at HMAS Albatross (air station) NSW, believed erected when used by the RAAF in 1944.
 One at the Army Aviation Centre, Oakey, Queensland.
 One at Toowoomba, Queensland, is owned by the Darling Downs Aero Club.
 One in Mackay Airport, Queensland, is owned by Chrisair Maintenance.
 One occupied on Temora Airport, NSW, by the Temora Aero Club.  Built in 1940 for 10 EFTS.
 One was dismantled and transported from Parkes, New South Wales and set up at Vung Tau Air Base by No. 5 Airfield Construction Squadron (5ACS) during the Vietnam War and may still exist. Three remain at Parkes.
 One at Tocumwal Historical Aerodrome, NSW, is owned by Tim Becroft of Tocumwal Aviation.
 Two single and one double at the former RAAF No 6 Stores Depot Dubbo, NSW.
 Two exist at Narromine airport, NSW, remaining from use by 5 EFTS and 618 Squadron RAF 1940–45.  Also one dismantled but apparently complete.
 One has been re-erected at Bathurst Airport in 2016.  A second is stored there dismantled. 

Two from Maryborough airport were relocated in Maryborough. One is located at Tarrants Pty Ltd and is used as a service centre for their garage. The other was extended and is located at the Maryborough sugar factory.

See also
 B hut
 Dymaxion deployment unit
 Iris hut
 Quonset hut
 Romney hut
 Rubb hall
 Tin tabernacle, prefabricated churches made from corrugated galvanised steel
 Patera Building

References

 Air Publication 3236 (1956) ‘WORKS - The Second World War 1939-1945 Royal Air Force’, Issued by Air Ministry (AHB).
 World War II Hangars -Guide to Hangar Identification Technical Bulletin 02/02, Defence Estates, Ministry of Defence UK, 2002 <https://web.archive.org/web/20160324051633/http://www.rafmonument.nl/_files/file/raf-hangars.pdf>
 Francis, P. 1996 British Military Airfield Architecture: from Airships to the Jet Age. Yeovil: Patrick Stephens Limited (pp100–101)
 UK Ministry of Defence maintenance manual for Bellman hangars <http://webarchive.nationalarchives.gov.uk/20121026065214/http://www.mod.uk/NR/rdonlyres/7C6B0389-2A4F-4B39-AFAA-7B01B1D4A61C/0/fs15.pdf>
 Dunn John, 2006 Comeng: A History of Commonwealth Engineering, Rosenberg Publishing, p68
 Chris Coulthard-Clark, The RAAF in Vietnam: Australian air involvement in the Vietnam War 1962–1975
 http://raafacs.homestead.com/5ACSVIETNAM.html

External links

Iron and steel buildings
Aircraft hangars
Military equipment of World War II